The Entrance, an electoral district of the Legislative Assembly in the Australian state of New South Wales, was created in 1988 as part of a redistribution of seats following the expansion of the Assembly from 99 to 109 seats.


Members for The Entrance

Election results

Elections in the 2010s

2019

2015

2011

Elections in the 2000s

2007

2003

Elections in the 1990s

1999

1995

1992 by-election

1991

Elections in the 1980s

1988

References

New South Wales state electoral results by district